Jarell is the name of:

 Jarell Carter (born 1995), American football cornerback
 Jarell Christian (born 1986), American former professional basketball player
 Jarell Eddie (born 1991), American professional basketball player
 Jarell Martin (born 1994), American professional basketball player

See also
 J-Boog (born Jarell Damonté Houston Sr.), American R&B singer